Skaw is a settlement in the Scottish archipelago of Shetland, located on the island of Unst. It is located north of Haroldswick on a peninsula in the northeast corner of the island, and is the most northerly settlement in the United Kingdom.

Etymology
Skaw is derived from the Old Norse "Skagi" meaning a cape, headland, promontory or peninsula.

Geography
The burn of Skaw flows from the uplands to the west through the constellation of small crofts that make up Skaw, and then east into the Wick of Skaw, a bay of the North Sea.  A sheltered sandy beach lines the coast of the Wick of Skaw. The unclassified road (Holsens Road) from the B9087 to Skaw is the most northerly road in the UK road network.

History
Walter Sutherland (died ), a former inhabitant of the northernmost cottage in Britain, was reportedly the last native speaker of the Norn language.

During World War II, the Royal Air Force built a Chain Home radar station at Skaw. The radar station was built in 1941 and closed in 1947. It was part of the defences of the RAF Sullom Voe flying boat base.

A combined Coastal Defence U-boat and Chain Home Low station was also built during the Second World War at Saxa Vord; after the war this became a ROTOR radar station. RAF Saxa Vord continued as a radar station after the end of the ROTOR programme.

The settlement is near the proposed Shetland Space Centre.

See also

 Extreme points of the United Kingdom
 Skagen, a spit and town in Denmark with a cognate name

References

External links

 
 Pictures of Skaw
 Shetland Today's info about Skaw and Unst

Villages in Unst
Norn language